This is a list of public art in Harlow in Essex, including statues, busts and other memorials. This list applies only to works of public art on permanent display in an outdoor public space and as such does not include, for example, artworks in museums.

Town Centre

Water Gardens

North Harlow

Harlow Museum grounds

St John's Arts and Recreation Centre

South Harlow

River Stort

North of Town Centre

See also
 Harlow art trust

References

Harlow
Lists of buildings and structures in Essex